This is a list of screen and stage performers who publicly indicated support for Hillary Clinton in the 2016 United States presidential election.

Those who indicated their support after Hillary Clinton's presumptive nomination on June 11 are denoted with an asterisk.

Actors

Comics and comedians

Notes

References 

Endorsements, non-political
Clinton, Hillary, non-political
Clinton, Hillary, 2016, non-political